The Sava Dolinka is a headwater of the Sava River in northwestern Slovenia. The stream goes underground soon after its source and breaks out again after 5 km at an elevation of 842 m in Zelenci, near Kranjska Gora. The Sava Dolinka flows through Kranjska Gora, Gozd Martuljek, Jesenice, between Bled and Breg, and past the town of Lesce. The first in a series of hydroelectric power plants on the river, the Moste Hydro Power Plant (22.5 MW), is located near Žirovnica. It merges with the second major headwater of the Sava, the Sava Bohinjka, at Radovljica. Tributaries of the Sava Dolinka include the Triglav Bistrica at Mojstrana and the Radovna, which flows through the Vintgar Gorge near Bled.

References

External links

 Condition of Sava Dolinka - graphs, in the following order, of water level, flow and temperature data for the past 30 days (taken in Blejski Most by ARSO)

Rivers of Upper Carniola
Rivers of the Julian Alps
Sava